Joe Johnson (born 29 July 1952) is an English former professional snooker player and commentator, best known for winning the 1986 World Championship after starting the tournament as a 150–1 outsider.

A former English Amateur Championship and World Amateur Championship finalist, Johnson turned professional in 1979, and after several years as an unranked player, reached the final of the 1983 Professional Players Tournament, where he lost 8–9 to Tony Knowles. In 1986, as an underdog, he defeated Steve Davis 18–12 to win the 1986 World Snooker Championship. The following year, he reached the final again, losing 14–18 to Davis.

At the 1987 UK Championship, Johnson came close to making a maximum 147 break, missing the pink ball on 134. Johnson also won the 1987 Scottish Masters, the 1989 Norwich Union Grand Prix and the 1991 Nescafe Extra Challenge before retiring from professional play in 2004. He has also won the 1997 Seniors Pot Black and the 2019 Seniors Masters, and provides regular snooker match commentary on Eurosport.

Early life and amateur career 
Joe Johnson was born on 29 July 1952 in Bradford, England. His mother was named Margaret and his biological father was engineer Malik Farooq. The pair separated when Johnson was two years old. When Johnson was four, his mother married Ken Johnson, who later taught him snooker. Johnson was National Under-19 champion in 1971 and three times Yorkshire Champion. In 1978 he set the record for the highest  by an amateur player, recording a 140 break at the Middlesbrough TUC Club.

He was runner-up to Terry Griffiths in the English Amateur championship of 1978 and was England's representative at the 1978 World Amateur Snooker Championship in Malta. Johnson reached the final, where he was defeated 11–5 by Wilson. They finished their first  session level at five  each, then Wilson won the next six frames to secure victory. Johnson made the highest  of the tournament, 101. He was accepted as a  professional by the World Professional Billiards and Snooker Association in 1979, as were Wilson, Tony Meo and Mike Hallett. Before taking up snooker professionally, Johnson worked as an apprentice motor mechanic and later as a gas fitter.

Professional career

Early years
At the 1979 Canadian Open, Johnson defeated Steve Baruda 5–4 after making a 100 break in the first frame. In the next round, Johnson eliminated John Bear 9–7; he then lost 2–9 in the last 16 to Kirk Stevens. He won the billiards title that ran alongside the snooker competition, by defeating Ian Williamson 500–284 in the final.

Johnson lost his opening match at the 1979 UK Championship, a last 24 encounter with Bill Werbeniuk by 9 frames to 3. At the 1980 British Gold Cup, Johnson had Willie Thorne and Ray Edmonds in his qualifying group. Johnson lost 0–3 to Thorne but beat Edmonds 2–1, which was not enough for Johnson to qualify out of his group. At the 1980 World Championship Johnson beat Roy Andrewartha 9–5 in Round 1 and progressed to the last 48 where he lost 6–9 to Pat Houlihan.

At the 1980 UK Championship in which he eliminated John Dunning 9–6 in the last 32 before losing 9–4 in the next round to Patsy Fagan. At the 1981 Yamaha Organs Trophy Johnson lost all three of his qualifying round matches; he was beaten 0–3 by both Mike Hallett and Knowles and 1–2 by Willie Thorne. The following event however, the 1981 English Professional Championship saw Johnson eliminate Knowles with a 9–2 win in the first round. Johnson received a walkover in the last 16 against John Pulman to progress to the quarter-finals, where he lost 5–9 to Ray Edmonds. At the 1981 World Championship Johnson lost his opening match, a last 48 encounter with Meo, 8–9.

His first event of the 1981–82 snooker season was the 1981 International Open in which he beat Jim Donnelly 5–4 in Round 1, Murdo MacLeod 5–1 in Round 2 and received a walkover against John Pulman in Round 3. In Round 4 Johnson beat Jim Wych 5–3 and then lost in Round 5, the last 32, 3–5 to Graham Miles. In the 1981 UK Championship Johnson began with a 9–1 win over Tommy Murphy in Round 2. This was followed by a Round 3 9–3 defeat of Mike Watterson and in Round 4 a 9–4 win over Wilson. In round 5 Johnson beat the former three-time world champion John Spencer 9–5 and this earned Johnson a last 16 appearance at the UK Championship against another former world champion, Ray Reardon, to whom Johnson lost 7–9. At the 1982 International Masters, Johnson began the event in the pre-qualifying group stage with a 2–1 loss against Dave Martin, and 2–0 wins over both Geoff Foulds and Cliff Wilson. The results were enough to take Johnson into the next qualifying round where he lost 1–2 to John Virgo, but beat Spencer 2–1 and Dave Martin (again) 2–0. In the third and final group stage Johnson lost 0–2 to Dennis Taylor and Reardon but beat Virgo 2–1, but the win was not enough to take Johnson out of the group stage. In Round 1 of the 1982 World Championship Johnson beat Vic Harris 9–4 and reached the last 48, where he lost 8–9.

1982–85
Johnson started the season still unranked. Having received a walkover against John Phillips in Round 1 of the 1982 International Open, Johnson lost his last 48 match against Wilson 5–4. In the last 32 of the 1982 Professional Players Tournament Johnson began with a 5–1 last 64 win against Graham Miles and a last-32 5–1 win against Kirk Stevens. Johnson followed this up with a 5–4 last 16 win over Mark Wildman and in the quarter final Johnson was beaten 5–1 by John Virgo, a result which earned Johnson his first ranking points. In qualifying for the 1983 World Championship Johnson scored a 10–0 whitewash over Paul Watchorn in Round 1 but lost 8–9 to Wilson and thus failed to reach the main event at the Crucible Theatre.

Johnson's points from the previous season saw him ranked ranked 23rd in the world. In the last 48 of the 1983 International Open Johnson beat Dennis Hughes 5–1 and then lost 2–5 to Eddie Charlton in the last 32. Johnson began the untelevised 1983 Professional Players Tournament in fine form with an opening frame 117 break in a last 64 5–3 win over Pascal Burke. In the last 32 Johnson beat a young up and coming Jimmy White 5–3 to set up a rematch against Eddie Charlton, which this time Johnson won 5–0 and included a 111 break. In the quarter final Johnson beat the highly ranked Cliff Thorburn 5–1 and in the semi-final Johnson beat Meo 9–6 to reach his first major final, against Knowles. 1–6 down to Knowles at one stage, Johnson fought back to take the match to a decider, and losing 9–8. At the 1983 UK Championship Johnson beat Matt Gibson 9–6. In the last 32 Johnson made a 119 break on his way to beating John Virgo 9–6 in the last 32. In the last 16 Johnson beat David Taylor 9–3 to earn himself another quarter final appearance where he lost 2–9 to Griffiths. At the 1984 Classic Johnson beat Frank Jonik 5–2 in the last 48 before losing 5–4 to Spencer in the last 32. At the 1984 International Masters Johnson lost 0–2 to Colin Roscoe and Doug French in the qualifying group stage. In qualifying for the 1984 World Championship Johnson won his first match, a last 48 encounter with Matt Gibson 10–3 and this earned Johnson made his debut at the Crucible stage of the 1984 World Snooker Championship, where he was beaten 10–1 by Dennis Taylor.

Johnson started the 1984/85 season ranked 19th in the World. At the 1984 Costa Del Sol Classic Johnson made a 105 break in his 3–1 quarter final win over Mick Fisher and then lost 3–2 in the semi-final to Dennis Taylor. At the 1984 International Open Ranking event, Johnson beat Mario Morra 5–0 in the last 48 and Eddie Charlton 5–1 in the last 32 before losing again to Dennis Taylor, this time 5–2 in the last 16. In the following ranking event, the 1984 Grand Prix Johnson beat Paul Medati 5–1 in the last 64 but then lost 4–5 to Ian Williamson last 32. At the 1984 UK Championship Johnson beat John Rea 9–6 in the last 48 and Spencer by the same scoreline in the last 32. In the last 16 Kirk Stevens beat Johnson 9–2. In the 1985 Mercantile Credit ranking event Johnson reached the semi-final with a last-48 5–4 win over Ray Edmonds, a 5–1 last 32 win over Knowles and a 5–0 whitewash of Wilson in the last 16, then a 5–1 win over Warren King in the quarter final. In the semi-final Johnson met Cliff Thorburn and lost by 9 frames to 2.

1985–86 season – World Champion
Johnson began the season inside the top 16 for the first time in his career, at 16th. Going into the 1986 World Championship, Johnson was relatively unheralded, especially as he had never won a televised match until the previous year. He had also never won a match at the Crucible Theatre, and was rated a 150–1 outsider. 

He defeated Dave Martin 10–3 in the first round, recording his first win in three World Championship appearances. In the second tound, he took a 5–3 lead against Mike Hallett after the first session and went on to win 13–6. He met former champion Griffiths in the quarter-finals. Johnson led 9–7 going into the final session, but Griffiths then won five straight frames to lead 12–9 before Johnson won four straight frames himself, including two century breaks to win 13–12. Despite having taken painkillers for a cyst on his back before the start of play, he eliminated Knowles, taking the last two frames of the final session to complete a 16–8 victory.

In the final he met world number one Steve Davis; the two players had never previously played a professional match against each other. Davis was considered much more likely to win the final, reflected in the bookmakers' odds of 2/9 for Davis and 5/1 for Johnson. Davis took a 3–1 lead, during which he made breaks of 108 and 107. Johnson then took the next three frames to finish the first session 4–3 ahead. Davis started the second session by winning four frames in succession to put himself 7–4 ahead. After the next mid-session interval, Johnson won four consecutive frames, before Davis clinched the last frame to leave the match level at 8–8 overnight.

On the second day, Johnson wore an unusual pair of red, pink and white leather shoes. On resuming the match, he won another run of four frames to take him into a 12–8 lead. The third session ended with Johnson 13–11 ahead. In the final session, the crowd appeared to favour Johnson, who had played with an attacking style throughout the tournament. He won three of the next four frames to lead 16–12 before the mid-session interval. He than added frame 29, and compiled a break of 64 in frame 30 to win the match 18–12. The win helped lift him from 16th place in the 1985–1986 professional rankings to eighth for 1986–1987.

He wore a T-shirt with the slogan "Bradford's Bouncing Back" (a reference to the Bradford City stadium fire a year earlier) when he was not playing during the tournament. Johnson's win led to an appearance on television show Wogan, as well as him accompanying pop star Cliff Richard to watch Wimbledon.

Post World Championship win
Johnson had a poor season in terms of results as world champion, until the 1987 World Snooker Championship. By his own admission, he arrived at the Crucible for the 1987 World Championship hoping merely to progress past the first round. However, he defied expectations and reached the final again, en route edging out a young Stephen Hendry 13–12 in the quarter-finals. Once again his opponent in the final was Davis, but this time Johnson was defeated 18–14. He reached number 5 in the world rankings in the 1987–88 season, largely as a result of his performances at the Crucible.

Johnson won the invitational Scottish Masters in 1987, overcoming Griffiths 9–7 in the final to take his only other major professional snooker title. He reached the semi-finals of the 1987 UK Championship, where he came close to making a 147 maximum break against White, but missed the pink on 134, and went on to lose the match 4–9. Later that season he also reached the semi-finals of the Masters, losing 6–3 to eventual champion Davis.

Johnson lost 10–8 to Darren Morgan in the opening round of the 1990 World Championship. He finished the 1989/90 season ranked number 11.

1990s
Johnson started the season outside of the top 16 ranked No.18 in the World. The first ranking event of the season saw Johnson lose to Colin Roscoe in the last 64 of the 1990 Grand Prix and this was followed last 64 defeats to James Wattana in the 1990 Asian Open and Jim Wych in the 1990 Dubai Classic. In the 1990 UK Championship Johnson eliminated Warren King 9–8 in the last 64 and followed that with a 9–5 victory over Gary Natale in the last 32 before losing to John Parrott 9–8 in the last 16. In the following ranking event, the 1991 Classic, Johnson elimnated Paddy Browne in the last 64 and a 5–0 win over John Campbell took Johnson into the last 16 where he lost 5–3 to Rod Lawler. A last 64 win against Chris Cookson in the 1991 British Open took Johnson to the last 32 where he lost to Mike Hallet. A 10–8 victory over Nigel Bond saw Johnson qualify for his last appearance at the Crucible in the World Championship where he lost 6–10 to Dennis Taylor.

Johnson started the season as World number 26. In the first ranking event of the season, 1991 Dubai Classic, Johnson beat Andy Hicks in the last 64 and Brady Gollan in the last 32 to set up a last-16 match against Peter Francisco where he lost 4–5. Johnson went one better in the following ranking event, the 1991 Grand Prix, when he beat Warren King in the last 64, Tony Jones in the last 32 and Mike Hallett in the last 16 to set up a quarter final against Nigel Bond where he lost 3–5.  
Johnson lost both of his first round last 64 matches in the next ranking events, the 1992 Classic to Paul McPhillips, to Meo in the 1992 Asian Open. In the next ranking event, the 1992 Welsh Open, Johnson won against Paul McPhillips in the last 64 and Knowles in last 32 to set up a last 16 match against Steve James who whitewashed him 5–0. Johnson reached the last 16 again in the following tournament, the 1992 British Open, when he beat Joe Grech in the last 64, Nigel Bond in the last 32 before losing to Alain Robidoux in the last 16. Johnson narrowly missed out on qualifying for the 1992 World Championship after he lost 10–9 to Mick Price in the last 48, Johnson did however make a 141 break during the match – the highest break of the qualifying tournament.

Johnson's ranking rose to 23rd at the start of the season. The first ranking event of the season saw him lose 5–2 to Nick Dyson in the last 64 of the 1992 Dubai Classic. At the 1992 Grand Prix Johnson lost 1–5 to Steve James in the last 32. At the 1992 UK Championship, Johnson won the deciding frame to beat Darren Clarke 9–8 before a 1–9 loss to Gary Wilkinson in the last 32. In the 1993 European Open Johnson beat Anthony Davies in the last 64 and caused an upset by beating Parrott 5–3 before losing by the same scoreline to Mick Price in the last 16. Parrott eliminated Johnson in the last 16 of the 1993 Asian Open after Johnson had beaten Martin Clark in the last 32 and Troy Shaw in the last 64. The penultimate event before the World Championship saw Johnson whitewashed 0–5 by Billy Snaddon in the last 64 of the 1993 International Open. Needing to win one match to qualify for the World Championship, Johnson lost 10–6 to Karl Payne in the last 48.

Johnson's ranking had dropped to No. 26 for the start of the 1993–94 season.

Later career
Johnson suffered heart and eye problems during the 1990s, although he continued to play in qualifying events. In the 1994 UK Championship, Johnson was ranked 37th in the World, and lost 9–7 to Terry Griffiths in the first round. In the first round of the 1996 UK Championship, Johnson overcame Dene O'Kane by a 9–8 scoreline. Johnson then defeated Tai Pichit 9–6 in round 2, before losing 9–6 to Parrott in the last 16. In the 1997 UK Championship, Johnson lost in the first round to Quinten Hann. A 5–4 win over Ali Carter in the final qualifying round of the 1997 International Championship took Johnson into the First Round, where he defeated Martin Clark 5–1. In Round 2, the last 32, Johnson lost to Parrott. Johnson won the Seniors Pot Black Trophy in 1997.

In the 1998 Grand Prix, Johnson made the last 32. Johnson lost 5–4 to Steve Judd in Round 5 of the 1998 UK Championship. In the 1999 UK Championship, Johnson eliminated Tony Jones in Round 2, before losing 9–7 to Parrott in Round 3.

In the 2000 UK Championship, Johnson lost his opening match in Round 3 to Mark Gray. In the 2000 World Championship, Johnson beat Somporn Kathawung in Round 4, before losing to Ian McCulloch in Round 5.

Johnson started the season as World No.90. At the 2002 LG Cup, Johnson was beaten in the last 128 5–3 by Bob Chaperon, and by 5–4 in the last 128 of the 2002 British Open by Darren Clarke. At the 2002 UK Championship, Johnson beat David John 5–3 in the last 128, before losing 5–3 to Rod Lawler. These last-128 defeats then followed: 5–2 against Justin Astley in the 2003 Welsh Open, 5–4 against David McLellan in the 2003 European Open, 5–2 against James Reynolds in the 2003 Irish Masters, and 5–0 against Nick Pearce in the 2003 Scottish Open. In the 2003 World Championship, however, Johnson beat David McLellan 10–5 in the last 128, Simon Bedford 10–6 in the last 96, and Bradley Jones in the last 80, to set up a last-64 match against Ian McCulloch, which Johnson lost 7–10. Johnson finished the season as World number 96.

Johnson broke his ankle after falling at home before the start of the 2003–04 season, and did not compete in any events until the 2004 World Championship in February 2004. He conceded at 0–9 behind to Ian Preece in their best-of-19 frames match. Later that month, he played his last match as a professional, in the qualifying rounds of the 2004 Players Championship where he lost to 3–5 to Stuart Mann. He retired officially in 2005, when, aged 53, he was the oldest player on the professional snooker circuit.

After the revival of the World Seniors event, Johnson was seeded to the quarter-finals of the 2010 event, where he lost to Davis. In the 2011 event, Johnson was seeded into the last 16, where he lost to Parrott, and this was followed by similar defeats in Round 1 to Darren Morgan in 2012, Stephen Hendry in 2013, and Paul McPhillips in 2015.

On 11 April 2019 he won the World Seniors Masters.

Outside snooker
Johnson was the subject of This is Your Life, and a guest on the celebrity sports quiz A Question of Sport, in 1986. In April 1987, BBC1 broadcast a 30-minute profile of Johnson, called An Ordinary Joe, focusing on his year since his world championship victory. He made several appearances on the snooker-themed game show Big Break between 1991 and 2001. Johnson was interviewed for an episode of the Radio 5 show Time of My Life in 1998, and a featured as guest on the TV quiz show  Celebrity Eggheads in 2012.

In his spare time Johnson sang in a band (Dresden) claiming to have the best voice among the top players of his era. Johnson was an early influence on, and friend of, the late snooker player Paul Hunter. Johnson has established himself as a regular commentator for Eurosport. In December 2013 John Higgins was quoted as saying in reference to Johnson: "I heard before the tournament 2013 UK Championship Joe Johnson was slating me. If that guy isn't the worst commentator in the world, he's in the top three".

Johnson owned a snooker club called Cue Gardens in Bradford and ran a coaching academy with Richard Harrison. Johnson is married with five sons and two daughters.

Performance and rankings timeline

Career finals

Ranking finals: 3 (1 title)

Non-ranking finals: 8 (5 titles)

Amateur finals: 3 (1 title)

Notes

References
Citations

Bibliography

External links
 
 Joe Johnson at WorldSnooker.com

1952 births
Living people
Sportspeople from Bradford
English snooker players
Winners of the professional snooker world championship